The Roman Catholic Archdiocese of Oristano is a metropolitan see of the Roman Catholic Church in Sardinia, Italy. It was created in the eleventh century. Its only suffragan is the Diocese of Ales-Terralba.

Since 2019 the Archbishop of Oristano has been Roberto Carboni.

Archbishops
1202–1223  Bernardo
1224–1253  Torgotorio de Muru
1254–      A...
1261–      Torgotorio Cocco
1268–1279  Aleardo
1280–1289  Pietro
1296–1299  Scolay de Ardigellis
1299–1301  Consiglio Gatto
1299–      Alamanno
1301–1305  Leonardo Aragall
1306–1308  Ugone
1308–1312  Oddone della Sala
1312–1339  Guido Cattaneo
1340–1342  Giovanni de Paperonibus
1342–1346  Giovanni di Cambray
1342–      Pietro Munichi
1346–1349  Pietro
1349–1360  Nicolò
1360–1363  Bernardo
1363–1377  Ambrogio
1377–      Enrico
1382–1386  Giacomo
1386–1387  Gonario
1387–1392  Leonardo De Zori
1392–1396  Corrado da Cloaco
1396–1400  Ubaldino Cambi
1400–1403  Mariano Fabario
1403–1404  Paolo Olemi
1404–1406  Nicola Berruto
1404–      Bartolomeo Ghini
1406–1414  Bertrando Flores
1414–1437  Elia di Palmas
1437–1450  Lorenzo Squinto
1450–1454  Giorgio Attacco
1454–1460  Giacomo D'Alberale
1460–1462  Francesco Arnesti
1462–1485  Giovanni Dessì
1485–1492  Ferdinando Romano
1492–1510  Giacomo Serra
1510–1517  Pietro Serra De Munoz
1517–1520  Giovanni Briselot
1520–1530  Giovanni Clerc
1530–1535  Agostino Grimaldi
1536–      Goffredo Pugiasson
1537–1554  Carlo de Alagon
1554–1556  Andrea Sanna
1556–1565  Pietro Sanna
1566–1571  Gerolamo Barberano
1572–1574  Pietro Buerba
1574–1577  Pietro Noarro
1578–1588  Francesco Figo
1588–1621  Antonio Canopolo
1621–1627  Lorenzo Nieto
1627–1641  Gavino Magliano
1641–1657  Pietro de Vico
1657–1684  Alfonso de Sotomajor
1664–1671  Bernardo Cotoner
1672–1685  Pietro de Alagon
1685–1702  Pietro de Accorrà y Figo
1704–1717  Francesco Masones Nin
1726–1740  Antonio Nin
1741–1744  Vincenzo Giovanni Vico Torrellas
1744–1746  Nicolò Maurizio Fontana
1746–1772  Luigi Emanuele de Carretto di Camerana
1772–1776  Antonio Romano Malingri
1778–1782  Giacomo Francesco Tommaso Astesan
1784–1798  Giuseppe Luigi Cusano di Sagliano
1798–1812  Francesco Maria Sisternes de Oblites
1812–1821  Giovanni Maria Azzei
1828–1840  Giovanni Maria Bua
1842–1860  Giovanni Saba
1872–1878  Antonio Soggiu
1879–1882  Bonfiglio Mura
1882–1992  Paolo Giuseppe Maria Serci Serra
1893–1898  Francesco Zunnui Casula
1899–1914  Salvatore Tolu
1914–1920  Ernesto Maria Piovella
1921–1938  Giorgio Maria Delrio
1938–1947  Giuseppe Cogoni
1947–1979  Sebastiano Fraghì
1979–1985  Francesco Spanedda
1986–2006  Pier Giuliano Tiddia
2006–2019  Ignazio Sanna
2019–present Roberto Carboni

It would appear that a process has begun to permanently unite the diocese of Ales-Terralba and the archdiocese of Oristano. The Bishop of  Ales-Terralba, Roberto Carboni, O.F.M. Conv., was promoted on 4 May 2019 to be Archbishop of Oristano and on the same date was appointed Apostolic Administrator of his former diocese of Ales-Terralba.  However, on 3 July 2021, without losing his position as Archbishop of Oristano, he was reappointed Bishop of Ales-Terralba. The announcement specifies that this act unifies the two dioceses in persona Episcopi ('in the person of the Bishop').

References

External links

Roman Catholic dioceses in Sardinia
Diocese
Dioceses established in the 11th century